Wiedemann is a German surname. Notable people with the surname include:

Barbara Wiedemann (born 1945), American poet
Christian Rudolph Wilhelm Wiedemann (1770–1840), German physician, historian, naturalist
Elisabeth Wiedemann (1926-2015), German actress
Ferdinand Johann Wiedemann (1805–1887), Baltic German linguist
Fritz Wiedemann (1891–1970), German soldier, Nazi Party activist and diplomat
George Wiedemann (1833–1890), German American brewer
Gustav Heinrich Wiedemann (1826–1899), German physicist
Hermann Wiedemann (1879–1944), German operatic baritone and academic teacher 
Kent M. Wiedemann, American diplomat
Elettra Rossellini Wiedemann (born 1983), American fashion model
Thorsten Wiedemann (born 1985), German rugby union player
Thomas Ernst Josef Wiedemann (1950–2001), German-British historian

See also
Wiedemann–Franz law, named after Gustav Heinrich Wiedemann
Wiedemann Range
Wiedeman
Wiedmann
Wiedermann

German-language surnames